The Zhenzhuchong Formation is an Early Jurassic geologic formation in China. Plesiosaur remains are among the fossils that have been recovered from its strata. Remains of the prosauropod Lufengosaurus huenei have been recovered from this formation As well as dinosaur footprints.

See also

 List of dinosaur-bearing rock formations
 List of stratigraphic units with indeterminate dinosaur fossils

Footnotes

References
 Weishampel, David B.; Dodson, Peter; and Osmólska, Halszka (eds.): The Dinosauria, 2nd, Berkeley: University of California Press. 861 pp. .

Jurassic System of Asia

Hettangian Stage
Sinemurian Stage
Pliensbachian Stage
Jurassic China